The Men's 200 metres T11 event at the 2012 Summer Paralympics took place at the London Olympic Stadium on 3 and 4 September.

Records
Prior to the competition, the existing World and Paralympic records were as follows:

Results

Round 1
Competed 3 September 2012 from 21:16. Qual. rule: winner of each heat (Q) plus the 7 fastest other times (q) qualified.

Heat 1

Heat 2

Heat 3

Heat 4

Heat 5

Semifinals
Competed 4 September 2012 from 12:18. Qual. rule: winner of each heat (Q) plus best second place (q) qualified.

Heat 1

Heat 2

Heat 3

Final
Competed 4 September 2012 at 20:15.

 
Q = qualified by place. q = qualified by time. RR = Regional Record. PB = Personal Best. SB = Seasonal Best. DQ = Disqualified. DNS = Did not start.

References

Athletics at the 2012 Summer Paralympics
2012 in men's athletics